H2 Motorsports was an American professional stock car racing team owned by Matt Hurley. The team operated part-time in the NASCAR Xfinity Series, fielding the No. 28 Toyota Supra for Shane Lee. The team shutdown before the start of the 2020 season due to financial troubles and because of the pending investigation against Hurley. The assets of H2 Motorsports were purchased by Sam Hunt Racing for the 2020 season.

Founder
Founder Matt Hurley was born April 5, 1996.  Hurley graduated from Cypress Lake High School in Fort Myers, Florida, and claims to have worked at least 40 hours per week since he was 14 years old.  Hurley once described himself as an "...investor, entrepreneur, and political hack..."

Hurley founded H2 Motorsports and based it in Mooresville, North Carolina.  H2's primary sponsor was Circuit City.  An entrepreneur, Hurley has started additional businesses such as H2 Innovation Center, and Youngbloods, Inc., a private holding company which later changed its name to the H2 Organization.  Hurley co-founded Torchlight Productions, a website design and development firm at the age of 15.

Controversy & legal actions
In 2017, Hurley leased a commercial building in Fort Myers, Florida for Southwest Florida Innovation Center, at a building named The Atrium, with plans to renovate the 132,000sf building with 42,000sf set aside for startup companies and the remainder of which were sublet spaces to other tenants. The estimate for the purchase and renovation was $20 Million. He was later sued for not paying rent, and the tenants in the building were evicted, including one business that was a United States Contract Postal Unit.  Hurley blamed a number of the tenant complaints and issues on the fact the building purchase had not been yet completed, and on hurricane Irma.  He is currently under investigation by the State of Florida's Office of Financial regulation, and was arrested for contempt of court in 2020.

Xfinity Series
The team announced on May 23, 2019, that they would attempt twenty races with Lee in the No. 28 Toyota Supra, beginning at Iowa in June with Circuit City as the sponsor for all races. In late summer 2019, it was revealed that Lee was signed for all of 2020, and that depending on sponsorship, the team could expand to two cars for 2020.

Due to concerns that their cars would not be ready in time for the three road course races in August with being a new team, H2 decided to skip those races (at Watkins Glen, Mid-Ohio, and Road America) and better prepare for the upcoming oval races.

Before the race at Darlington in September, they released Lee due to what they deemed a lack of performance, who the team released on August 28, 2019, after less than 3 months with the team and despite the fact that he finished in the top 21 in all but one of his races, and had great runs at both Daytona (before crashing in "the big one") and Iowa, where he finished in the top 10. No replacement driver was ever announced and the team didn't attempt any of the remaining races of the 2019 season. During the offseason it was announced that the team would be shutting down due to financial troubles. The remaining assets were sold to Sam Hunt Racing for the upcoming 2020 season.

Car No. 28 results

References

External links 
 Official site
 Personal Website

American auto racing teams
Defunct NASCAR teams
Auto racing teams established in 2019
NASCAR controversies